A Neill–Concelman connector may refer to:
 BNC connector, with bayonet-type fastening
 TNC connector, threaded version